The Gornergrat is a rocky ridge of the Pennine Alps, overlooking the Gorner Glacier south-east of Zermatt in Switzerland. It can be reached from Zermatt by the Gornergrat rack railway (GGB), the highest open-air railway in Europe. Between the Gornergrat railway station and the summit is the Kulm Hotel. In the late 1960s two astronomical observatories were installed in the two towers of the Kulmhotel Gornergrat. The project “Stellarium Gornergrat” is hosted in the Gornergrat South Observatory.

Overview
It is located about three kilometers east of Zermatt in the Swiss canton of Valais. The Gornergrat is located between the Gornergletscher and Findelgletscher and offers a view of more than 20 four-thousand metre peaks, whose highest are Dufourspitze (Monte Rosa massif), Liskamm, Matterhorn, Dom and Weisshorn.

This is the last stop of the Gornergrat train, opened in 1898, which climbs almost  through Riffelalp and Riffelberg. At the terminus on the south-western tip of the ridge is a hotel. The station forms part of the Zermatt ski area. From 1958 to 2007 there was a cable car from Gornergrat over the Hohtälli to the Stockhorn which, until the construction of the Klein Matterhorn cable car, was the highest mountain station in Zermatt.
At the west side of the Gorner Ridge, nearby the Rotenboden railway station is the peak Riffelhorn.

Observatory 
The observatory at the summit of Gornergrat was built on top of the Kulmhotel Gornergrat in the late 1960' and is most notably equipped with a 600 mm telescope built by Officina Stellare

Gallery

See also
Gornergratbahn
Riffelalptram
List of mountains of Switzerland accessible by public transport

References

External links

Mountains of Valais
Mountains of the Alps
Alpine three-thousanders
Tourist attractions in Switzerland
Articles containing video clips
Mountains of Switzerland